Deltocephalini is a tribe of leafhoppers in the subfamily Deltocephalinae. Deltocephalini contains 72 genera and more than 600 species.

Genera
There are currently 72 described genera within Deltocephalini:

References

External links
 
 

 
Deltocephalinae
Hemiptera tribes